The Principal of the University of Aberdeen is the working administrative head of the university, acting as its Chief Executive. He is responsible for the overall running of the university, presiding over the main academic body of the university, the Senatus Academicus. The Principal is normally also created Vice-Chancellor of the university, enabling him to perform the functions reserved to the Chancellor in the latter's absence, such as the awarding of degrees.

Professor George Boyne succeeded Sir Ian Diamond as Principal on 1 August 2018.

History
The current office of Principal dates to 1858 with the passage of the Universities (Scotland) Act 1858. The position was created with the amalgamation of the two existing ancient universities in Aberdeen, King's College (est. 1495) and Marischal College (est. 1593) in 1860.

List of Principals of the University of Aberdeen
1865—76 The Very Reverend Peter Colin Campbell
1876—85 The Very Reverend William Robinson Pirie
1885—1900 Sir William Duguid Geddes
1900—09 The Very Reverend John Marshall Lang
1909—35 Sir George Adam Smith
1936—48 Sir William Hamilton Fyfe
1948—62 Sir Thomas Murray Taylor
1962—76 Sir Edward Maitland Wright
1976—81 Sir Fraser Noble
1981—91 George Paul McNicol
1991—96 Maxwell Irvine
1996—2010 Sir Duncan Rice
2010—18 Sir Ian Diamond
2018—present George Boyne

List of Principals of former constituent colleges

Principals of King's College, Aberdeen

1500—34 Hector Boece
1569—83 Alexander Arbuthnot
1598—1632 Reverend Dr David Rait 
1640—51 William Guild 
1652—61 John Row
1800—15 Roderick MacLeod
1815—54 William Jack

Principals of Marischal College

1593—98 Robert Howie
1598—1614 Gilbert Gray
1616—19 Andrew Adie
1620—21 Reverend Dr William Forbes
1621—49 Patrick Dun
1649—61 William Moir
1661—78 James Leslie
1678—1717 Robert Paterson
1717—28 Thomas Blackwell (primus)
1728—48 John Osborne
1748—57 Thomas Blackwell (secundus)
1757—59 Robert Pollock
1758—96 George Campbell
1796—1830 William Laurence Brown
1832—60 Daniel Dewar

See also
 Chancellor of the University of Aberdeen
 Rector of the University of Aberdeen
 Ancient university governance in Scotland

References

People associated with the University of Aberdeen
Aberdeen
Aberdeen